The Gray Ghost is an American historical television series which aired in syndication from October 10, 1957, to July 3, 1958. The show is based upon the true story of Major John Singleton Mosby, a Virginia officer in the Confederate Army, whose cunning and stealth earned him the nickname "Gray Ghost".

Synopsis
The Gray Ghost stars Tod Andrews as Major Mosby, Phil Chambers as Sergeant Myles Magruder, and Sherwood Price in five episodes as General J.E.B. Stuart, also known for his cavalry skills. Recurring characters on the program were Donald Foster as Braddock, Jean Willes as Ansonia, Ralph Clanton as a general, Dick Jones as Ned Underwood, Otto Aldis as Mueller and John Banner as Major Heros von Borcke.

Gray Ghost was cancelled after one season of thirty-nine half-hour episodes. High production costs may have made the program too expensive to continue.

Production notes

The series was created by Lindsley Parsons Productions; the producer was Russell Hayden. William Paul Dunlap wrote the theme song. Virgil Carrington Jones, an expert on Mosby, was historical consultant for some episodes.

There are also two popular misconceptions about the series. The first is that it aired on the CBS network; it never did. The second is that the network and the sponsor did not wish to be affiliated with a show about Confederate soldiers. Syndicated shows, by definition, have no network sponsors. In New York City, The Gray Ghost ran not on WCBS-TV (Channel 2) but on WPIX (Channel 11), an independent station. It ran Thursdays from 8:30-9:00 p.m. The series was distributed "in association with CBS Television film series". Such closing credits gave some the wrong impression that the program had aired on CBS.

Notable guest stars

 Ray Boyle ("Conscript")
 Peter Breck ("The Deserter")
 Richard Beymer ("An Eye for an Eye")
 Harry Carey, Jr. ("The Picnic")
 Russ Conway ("Judith")
 Dennis Cross ("Sealed Orders")
 Francis De Sales ("Charity")
 Angie Dickinson ("Point of Honor")
 Ann Doran ("Charity")
 Anthony Eisley ("The Trial")
 Ross Elliott ("The Rivals")
 Dabbs Greer ("Rebel Christmas")
 Kevin Hagen ("The Missing Colonel")
 Ron Hagerthy ("A Problem of Command")
 Richard Jaeckel ("The Manhunt")
 Sammy Jackson ("Resurrection")
 Robert Knapp ("Rebel Christmas") 
 Charles Lane ("Secret and Urgent")
 Ruta Lee ("Contraband")
 Nan Leslie ("Conscript")
 Tyler MacDuff ("The Gallant Foe")
 Strother Martin ("Reconnaissance Mission")
 Walter Maslow ("The Humanitarian")
 Carole Mathews ("Greenback Raid")
 Denver Pyle ("Resurrection")
 Gloria Saunders ("The Angel of Loudoun")
 William Schallert ("Russell of 'The Times'")
 Karen Sharpe ("The Humanitarian")
 Liam Sullivan ("Point of Honor")
 Gloria Talbott ("Sealed Orders")

Adaptations
 adapted the series into a comic strip.

Footnotes

References
Classic TV Shows - Gray Ghost
 Gianakos, Larry James.Television Drama Series Programming: A Comprehensive Chronicle
 Castleman, Harry and Podrazik, Walter J, The TV Schedule Book

External links 
 

1957 American television series debuts
1958 American television series endings
1950s American drama television series
Black-and-white American television shows
First-run syndicated television programs in the United States
Television series about the American Civil War
Television series by CBS Studios
Television shows set in Virginia
1950s Western (genre) television series
Television shows adapted into comics